Dhama is a village situated in municipal limits of Lalamusa since the Municipal Committee of Lalamusa was established during British rule.

References

Populated places in Gujrat District